Acrolophus corymba is a moth of the family Acrolophidae. It is found in South America.

References

corymba
Moths described in 1914